The Brücke von Andau ( or Andaui híd) is a small bridge over the  / Hanság-főcsatorna, a small artificial river which forms part of the border between Austria and Hungary. It is located near to the village of Andau (Burgenland, Austria).

History 
With political turmoil in the People's Republic of Hungary during the summer and fall of 1956, more and more Hungarians fled to the west over the border to Austria. Even though it was just a small, wooden bridge over a small river, the bridge at Andau was the escape route for about 70,000 Hungarians during the Hungarian Revolution.

After crossing the border, fugitives had to walk a nine km (5.6 mi) long road, the "Road To Freedom" (Fluchtstraße), to the village of Andau, where they were received with great hospitality by the inhabitants of Andau and the surrounding villages.

On November 21, 1956, the bridge was blasted by Soviet troops.

Today 
In 1996, with the 40th anniversary of the Hungarian Revolution, the bridge was rebuilt as a symbol of tolerance and helpfulness. Organised as a joint operation by the Austrian and Hungarian armies, it replaced a stub bridge, which had been built by peasants for transportation reasons. At the same time, the Road Of Freedom was used as an open-air exhibition with the title "Road Of Woes", showing about ninety sculptures and other art works by Hungarian and Austrian artists.

Literature and film 
As a symbol of freedom, the bridge not only achieved fame with the book The Bridge at Andau by James Michener (1957), but also became a world-known memorial.

See also 
 Pusztasomorja, Jánossomorja

External links 
 Der Bockerer III on IMDB
 The Bridge At Andau on Amazon
 Pictures of the bridge and its surrounding area

Bridges in Austria
Bridges in Hungary
1956 in Austria
Hungarian Revolution of 1956
Neusiedl am See District
Győr-Moson-Sopron County
Austria–Hungary border crossings
Buildings and structures in Burgenland